Current broadcasters
Television: SportsNet New York (SNY) or WPIX channel 11
Gary Cohen, Ron Darling, Keith Hernandez, Steve Gelbs, Gary Apple, Todd Zeile
Radio: WCBS 880 AM (English)
Howie Rose, Keith Raad, Patrick McCarthy
Radio: WEPN 1050 AM (Spanish)
Max Perez Jimenez, Nestor Rosario

Broadcast history

Television
 SportsNet New York (2006–present)
 WPIX (1999–present)
 MSG Network (2002–2005)
 MSG Metro Channels (2002–2005)
 SportsChannel New York/FSN New York (1980–2005)
 (W)WOR-TV (1962–1998)

Television Broadcasters by Year

Radio

English
 WCBS 880 AM (2019–)
 WOR 710 AM (2014–2018)
 WFAN-FM 101.9 FM (2013)
 WFAN 1050 AM (1987–October 7, 1988); 660 AM (October 7, 1988–2013)
 WHN 1050 AM (1983–1987)
 WMCA 570 AM (1978–1982)
 WNEW 1130 AM (1975–1977)
 WHN 1050 AM (1972–1974)
 WJRZ (WWDJ after May 16, 1971) 970 AM (1967–1971)
 WHN 1050 AM (1964–1966)
 WABC 770 AM (1962–1963)

Spanish
 WEPN 1050 AM (2013–present)
 WQBU-FM 92.7 FM (2010–2012)
 WADO 1280 AM (1994–2009)

Radio Broadcasters by Year

Broadcasters

Current
 Gary Cohen: Radio (1989–2005), TV (2006–)
 Howie Rose: Radio (1994–1995, 2003–), TV (1996–2003,2006)
 Keith Hernandez: TV (1998–)
 Max Perez Jimenez: Spanish Radio (2005-)
 Ron Darling: TV (2006–)
 Gary Apple: TV, studio host (2006–)
 Jim Duquette: Radio/TV (2012–)
 Nestor Rosario: Spanish Radio (2011-)
 Steve Gelbs: TV, sideline reporter (2014-) 
 Andy Martino:TV, studio host (2014-)
 Eamon McAnaney: TV, studio analyst (2016-)
 Todd Zeile: TV, studio analyst (2016-)
 Michelle Margaux TV, studio host (2021-)
 Jerry Blevins: Radio/TV, analyst (2021-)
Keith Raad: Radio (2023-)
Patrick McCarthy:Radio (2023-)

Former
 Lindsey Nelson: Radio/TV (1962–1978)

 Buck Canel: Spanish Radio (1970-1979)
 Steve Albert: Radio/TV (1979–1981)
 Bob Goldsholl: TV (1980)
 Art Shamsky: Radio/TV (1981)
 Lorn Brown: TV (1982)
 Jiggs McDonald: TV (1982)
 Steve LaMar: Radio (1982–1984)
 Billy Berroa: WEPN Spanish Radio (1982–2007)
 Bud Harrelson: TV (1983)
 Steve Zabriskie: TV (1983–1989)
 Tim McCarver: TV (1983–1998)
 Don Criqui: TV (1991)
 Rusty Staub: TV (1986–1995)
 Bob Carpenter: TV (1992–1993)
 Todd Kalas: Radio (1992–1993)
 Mike Crispino: TV (1999–2001)
 Sean Kimerling: TV (1999-2003)
 Clemson Smith-Ruiz: TV (2003)
 Bob Murphy: TV (1962–1981); Radio (1962–2003)
 Matt Loughlin: TV, Pregame Host/Sideline Reporter (1996–2005)
 Tom Seaver: TV (1999–2005)
 Ted Robinson: Radio (2002–2003), TV (2002–2005)
 Dave O'Brien: TV (2003–2005)
 Fran Healy: TV, (1984–2005)
 Bill Daughtry: TV, Sideline Reporter (2002-2005)
 Kip Lewis:TV, Sideline Reporter (2003-2005)
 Chris Cotter: TV, Sideline Reporter (2006)
 Tom McCarthy: Radio (2006–2007)
 Dave Gallagher: TV, Studio Analyst (2007)
 Matt Yallof: TV, Studio Host (2006–2008)
 Harold Reynolds: TV, Studio Analyst (2008)
 Darryl Strawberry:TV, Studio Analyst (2008-2009)
 Dwight Gooden: TV, Studio Analyst (2010)
 Wayne Hagin: Radio (2008–2011)
 Tiffany Simmons TV:Sideline Reporter (2011-2012)
 Chris Carlin: TV, Studio Host (2009–2013)
 CJ Pappa: TV:Sideline Reporter (2012-2013)
 Ralph Kiner: Radio (1962–1981), TV (1962–2013)   
 Bob Ojeda: TV, Studio analyst (2009–2014)
 Seth Everett: Radio (2014)
 Cliff Floyd: TV, Studio analyst (2015)
 Scott Braun: TV (2015-2017)
 Alexa Datt: TV, Sideline reporter (2015-2017)
 Bobby Valentine:TV, studio analyst (2015-2017)
 Josh Lewin: Radio (2012–2018)
 John Franco:TV, Studio analyst (2015-2018)
 Nelson Figueroa: TV, Studio analyst (2015-2019)
 Justine Ward: TV, sideline reporter (2018-2019)
 John Sadak: Radio (2019)
 Juan Alicea: WEPN Spanish Radio (1982–2019)
 Jonas Schwartz:TV, studio host (2009-2020)
Doug Williams:TV,studio host/sideline reporter (2016-2021)
Anthony Recker:TV, studio analyst (2020-2021)
Gregg Caserta:: Radio (2021)
Ed Coleman: Radio (1996–2013, 2019-2022)
Jake Eisenberg:Radio (2022)
Chris Williamson:TV, studio host (2022)
Wayne Randazzo: Radio, TV (2015-2022)

Brendan Burke: Radio (2022)
Gary Thorne: Radio (1985–1988,2022), TV (1994–2002, 2021)
Brad Heller: Radio (2019-2022)
Terry Collins: Radio/TV, analyst (2021-2022)
Lee Mazzilli: Radio/TV, Studio Analyst/Analyst (2007–2008, 2021-2022)

See also
 List of current Major League Baseball announcers

References

 
New York Mets
Broadcasters
SportsChannel
Fox Sports Networks
Madison Square Garden Sports
SportsNet New York
CBS Radio Sports